VISD may refer to:
 Valentine Independent School District
 Van Independent School District
 Vega Independent School District
 Venus Independent School District 
 Veribest Independent School District 
 Vernon Independent School District
 Victoria Independent School District
 Vidor Independent School District
 Vysehrad Independent School District